

Helmuth Huffmann (31 July 1891 – 9 December 1975) was a German general during World War II. He was a recipient of the Knight's Cross of the Iron Cross of Nazi Germany.

Awards and decorations

 Knight's Cross of the Iron Cross on 30 September 1943 as Generalleutnant and commander of 62. Infanterie-Division

References

Citations

Bibliography

 

1891 births
1975 deaths
Military personnel from Essen
Lieutenant generals of the German Army (Wehrmacht)
German Army personnel of World War I
Recipients of the clasp to the Iron Cross, 1st class
Recipients of the Gold German Cross
Recipients of the Knight's Cross of the Iron Cross
German prisoners of war in World War II
People from the Rhine Province
German Army generals of World War II